Greene Township is one of the twenty-four townships of Trumbull County, Ohio, United States.  The 2000 census found 986 people in the township.

Geography
Located in the northern part of the county, it borders the following townships:
Colebrook Township, Ashtabula County - north
Wayne Township, Ashtabula County - northeast corner
Gustavus Township - east
Johnston Township - southeast corner
Mecca Township - south
Bristol Township - southwest corner
Bloomfield Township - west
Orwell Township, Ashtabula County - northwest corner

No municipalities are located in Greene Township. Starting in 1825 a crossroads settlement named "Greensburg" in the central part of the township had a post office; it was discontinued in 1892.

Name and history
Greene Township was established in 1819, and named after one Mr. Greene, a Connecticut Land Company agent. It is the only Greene Township statewide, although there are sixteen Green Townships statewide.

Government
The township is governed by a three-member board of trustees, who are elected in November of odd-numbered years to a four-year term beginning on the following January 1. Two are elected in the year after the presidential election and one is elected in the year before it. There is also an elected township fiscal officer, who serves a four-year term beginning on April 1 of the year after the election, which is held in November of the year before the presidential election. Vacancies in the fiscal officership or on the board of trustees are filled by the remaining trustees.

References

External links
County website

Townships in Trumbull County, Ohio
1819 establishments in Ohio
Townships in Ohio
Populated places established in 1819